Pecoma Grizzlies Groningen were a professional ice hockey team in Groningen, Netherlands. They played in the Dutch Eredivisie, the highest-level hockey division in the Netherlands.  Home games were played at the Sportcentrum Kardinge.

History

Founded on December 23, 1969, as Groninger IJshockey Stichting (GIJS), the team played in the lower divisions until 1976, when it began competing in the Eredivisie.  It won its first and only Eredivisie championship in the 1985-86 season, with 7 wins and 1 loss in the playoffs.

Failure to attract a major sponsor forced the team out of the Eredivisie from 1988 until 2007.  In 2007-2008, after winning two straight championships in the eerste divisie (the top amateur division), the team re-entered the Eredivisie for three seasons.  However, after three losing seasons and weak ticket sales, the team dropped out of the Eredivisie in the summer of 2010.

Season results

Note: GP = Games played, W = Wins, OTW = Overtime Wins, OTL = Overtime Losses, L = Losses, Pts = Points, GF = Goals for, GA = Goals against

Squad 2008-09

Goalies

 31 Mathieu Blanchard
 35 Tom Korte

Defence

 13 Jeroen Oosterwijk
 14 Noel Coultice
 19 Ronald Trip
 4 Preston Cicchine
 44 Blair Tassone
 98 Ricardo Dijkema

Forwards

 9 Derek Bachynski
 11 Danny Kerstholt
 14 Blair Lefebvre
 15 Ram Sidhu
 19 Jolke Balt
 20 Zahir Hup
 21 Alwin Assenberg
 22 Reinier Holthof
 24 Klaver Jan Middelweerd
 29 Nick Pomponio
 69 Arjan Peters

Coaches

 Coach: Sergey Yashin
 Teammanager: Kees Lok

Championships
Eredivisie National Championship
once: 1985-86

Eerste divisie championship
twice: 2005-06; 2006–07

External links
  
 Netherlands Ice Hockey Union 

Ice hockey teams in the Netherlands
Ice hockey clubs established in 1969
Sports clubs in Groningen (city)
1969 establishments in the Netherlands